The women's  100 metre freestyle event at the 1991 World Aquatics Championships took place 7 January.

Results

Heats
The heats were held on 7 January at 10:03.

Finals

Final B
The final B was held on 7 January at 19:39.

Final A
The final A was held on 7 January at 19:34.

References

USASwimming

Swimming at the 1991 World Aquatics Championships